Group A of the 2000 African Cup of Nations ran from 22 January until 31 January. It consisted of Ghana, Cameroon, Ivory Coast and Togo. The matches were held in Accra and Kumasi in Ghana. Cameroon and Ghana progressed to the quarterfinals.

Standings

Ghana vs. Cameroon

Ivory Coast vs. Togo

Ghana vs. Togo

Cameroon vs. Ivory Coast

Ghana vs. Ivory Coast

Cameroon vs. Togo

External links
Official website

2000 African Cup of Nations